Eupithecia rhombipennis is a moth in the family Geometridae. It is found in Colombia.

References

Moths described in 1911
rhombipennis
Moths of South America